Ellis is an unincorporated community in Byron Township, Cass County, Minnesota, United States, near Motley. It is along 79th Avenue SW (Cass County Road 106) near 80th Street SW (County Road 156).

References

Unincorporated communities in Cass County, Minnesota
Unincorporated communities in Minnesota